is a railway station in Yodogawa-ku, Osaka, Osaka Prefecture, Japan.

Lines
West Japan Railway Company
JR Tōzai Line

Layout
There is an island platform with two tracks on the second floor below ground, under the Tokaido Line (JR Kobe Line) between Tsukamoto and Amagasaki.

History 
Kashima Station opened on 8 March 1997 coinciding with the opening of the JR Tōzai Line between Kyobashi and Amagasaki.

Station numbering was introduced in March 2018 with Kashima being assigned station number JR-H48.

Adjacent stations

References 

Railway stations in Osaka Prefecture